Lieutenant-General James Cyrille Gervais, CMM, CD (born March 5, 1938) was the Commander, Mobile Command of the Canadian Forces.

Military career
Born at Rouyn-Noranda and educated at the University of Ottawa, Gervais graduated from the Royal Military College of Canada in 1962. He later attended the Royal Military College of Science in the United Kingdom.

He was appointed Commander of 5 Canadian Mechanized Brigade Group at Valcartier and then Chief of Personnel and Senior Appointments at National Defence Headquarters. In 1991 he was appointed Commander, Mobile Command in which role he carried out a restructuring of the Land Forces.

In retirement he became Deputy Secretary for Honours to the Governor-General of Canada. In 2008 he became Chairman of Northern Gold Mining.  He is also part of a management team operating a proposed medical marijuana growing business near Kirkland Lake, Ontario.

References

1938 births
Living people
Canadian generals
Canadian Army officers
Royal Military College of Canada alumni
Commanders of the Order of Military Merit (Canada)
Commanders of the Canadian Army
Canadian military personnel from Quebec